The Western Cascades is a region of the U.S. state of Oregon between the Willamette Valley and the High Cascades. Deposits of Western Cascades age are also found in adjacent southwest Washington state. The range contains many extinct shield volcanoes, cinder cones and lava flows. The range is highly eroded and heavily forested.

Geology
The region was volcanically active from approximately 35 to 17 million years ago. The province is characterized as an older, deeply eroded volcanic range lying west of the more recent snow-covered High Cascade Range. The Western Cascades began to form 40 million years ago with eruptions from a chain of volcanoes near the Eocene shoreline. As the regional angle of subduction steepened, volcanic activity gradually shifted to the east in the Miocene and Pliocene.

The Western Cascades are made up almost entirely of slightly deformed and partly altered volcanic flows and pyroclastic rocks which range in age from late Eocene to late Miocene. These rocks have been heavily dissected by erosion and the only evidence remaining of the many volcanoes from which they were erupted are occasional remnants of volcanic necks or plugs which mark former vents. There are also minor Pliocene to Pleistocene intracanyon lavas derived from the High Cascades or rare local vents. From youngest to oldest, the Western Cascade Range consists of four main units:
 0- to 4-million-year-old intracanyon basalt and basaltic andesite flows from the High Cascade Range.
 4- to 9-million-year-old basalt and basaltic andesite flows with lesser amounts of andesite and dacite. These rocks which cap the highest Western Cascade ridges were erupted prior to uplift and faulting along the east margin of the Western Cascade Range. This unit is compositionally identical to unit 1 and other rocks of the High Cascade Range, and therefore was probably erupted from vents in and adjacent to the High Cascades.
 9- to 18-million-year-old basalt, basaltic andesite, and andesite lavas with lesser amounts of dacite tuffs and lavas.
 18- to 40-million-year-old silicic tuffs and lavas. Units 3 and 4 were erupted from many vents west of known High Cascade volcanic centers, although some of these older vents may be buried beneath the High Cascade Range.

Wild life
Wildlife species richness is not as high in the West Cascades as it is in other temperate conifer forests, however the ecoregion is notable for comparatively high amphibian endemism. A diverse range of plant species including numerous endemics are found in the ecoregion but are especially concentrated near Mount Rainier in Washington and the Columbia River Gorge.
A number of amphibian targets are either West Cascade endemics or have a limited distribution. The Cascades torrent salamander Rhyacotriton cascadae and Larch Mountain salamander Plethodon larselli are restricted to the ecoregion, whereas Cope’s giant salamander Dicamptodon copei, Van Dyke’s salamander Plethodon vandykei, and the Cascades frog Rana cascadae occur only in the West Cascades and Pacific Coast ecoregions. Of these, the Larch Mountain and Van Dyke’s salamanders and the Cascades
frog are federal Species of Concern. Most of these amphibians are also closely associated with fast-moving, cold mountain streams.

Notable vents

See also
 List of volcanoes in the United States
 Types of volcanic eruptions

References
Portions of this article include public domain text from the USFS Deschutes & Ochoco National Forests - Crooked River National Grassland.

Further reading

.Western
Mountain ranges of Oregon
Regions of Oregon
Volcanism of Oregon